Familia may refer to:

 Familia, Latin designation of the family taxonomic rank
 Familia, a classical Roman household with a Pater familias
 Familia, historical designation for a Medieval household
 Familia, the word for Family in several languages and often used to identify individual families

People
 Alexandre da Sagrada Família (1737–1818), Portuguese bishop of the Azores
 Jeurys Familia (born 1989), Dominican professional baseball pitcher

Cinema and television
 Familia (1996 film), a 1996 Spanish-French film
 Familia (2005 film), a 2005 Canadian film
 "Familia", an episode of the American television drama Six Feet Under

Music
Família, a 2013 album by Beth
Familia (Sophie Ellis-Bextor album), released in 2016
Familia (Camila Cabello album), released in 2022
"Família", a 1987 single by Brazilian rock band Titãs
"Familia", a 2018 Nicki Minaj and Anuel AA song

Organizations
 Familia (political party), a Polish political party
 FAMILIA (lay apostolate), a Christian organization based in Minnesota

Other
 Familia (magazine), a Romanian literary magazine published 1865–1906
 Mazda Familia, a small car manufactured by Mazda

See also
 
 La Familia (disambiguation)
 Family (disambiguation)